Kattaiyankadu is a village in the Pattukkottai taluk of Thanjavur district, Tamil Nadu, India.

Demographics 

As per the 2001 census, Kattaiyankadu had a total population of 477 with 226 males and 251 females. The literacy rate was 64.76%.

References 

 

Villages in Thanjavur district